Amyloxenasma is a genus of corticioid fungi in the family Amylocorticiaceae. The widely distributed genus contains six species.

References

External links

Amylocorticiales
Taxa named by Franz Oberwinkler